Astroscleridae is a family of sponges belonging to the order Agelasida.

Genera:
 Astrosclera Lister, 1900
 Ceratoporella Hickson, 1912
 Cooperaria Finks, 1995
 Goreauiella Hartman, 1969
 Hispidopetra Hartman, 1969
 Parastrosclera Wu, 1991
 Spumisclera Wu, 1991
 Stromatospongia Hartman, 1969

References

Sponges